Makesi Jobari Lewis (born 11 July 1986 in Trinidad and Tobago) is a Trinidadian retired footballer.

Career

After playing for Oakland University in the United States, Lewis returned to Trinidad and Tobago with Morvant Caledonia United, before signing for Police because he expressed interest in becoming a policeman.

In 2016, he and his brother, Micah, almost sealed a move to Turkish top flight side Antalyaspor but it never happened.

In 2015/16, Lewis was top scorer of the Trinidadian top flight with Police, earning him 3 appearances with the Trinidad and Tobago national team.

References

External links
 

Living people
1986 births
Trinidad and Tobago footballers
Trinidad and Tobago international footballers
Association football forwards
Trinidad and Tobago expatriate footballers
Trinidad and Tobago expatriate sportspeople in the United States
Expatriate soccer managers in the United States
Oakland Golden Grizzlies men's soccer players
Morvant Caledonia United players
Police F.C. (Trinidad and Tobago) players